CJQQ-FM is a Canadian radio station, broadcasting at 92.1 FM in Timmins, Ontario. The station broadcasts a mainstream rock format as 92.1 Rock.

History
The station was originally launched in 1948 by Roy Thomson as CKGB-FM, a simulcast of AM sister station CKGB's CBC Trans-Canada Network programming. Thomson sold the stations in 1972, and the FM station adopted the callsign CFTI-FM in 1976. The stations were subsequently acquired by Telemedia in 1980.

In 1984, CFTI was authorized to drop its CBC Radio affiliation as network service was now available in the area from CBC-owned CBCJ-FM.

In 1992, Telemedia adopted the station's branding (as Q92), callsign CJQQ and format, which had been successful on Telemedia's CJRQ in Sudbury.

In 2002, Standard Broadcasting purchased Telemedia, and sold all of Telemedia's Northern Ontario stations to Rogers Media.

On June 7, 2016, CJQQ-FM rebranded the station as 92.1 Rock. The station uses the same general format as, and shares some programming with, CJRQ-FM in Sudbury and CKFX-FM in North Bay.

In March of 2018, morning show host Ryan Daly and cohost Vanessa Smith hosted a gathering of Timmins residents to say the word "wow" like actor Owen Wilson

References

External links
 92.1 Rock
 
 

Jqq
Jqq
Jqq
Radio stations established in 1948
1948 establishments in Ontario